The Indian River is a river in Algoma District in Northeastern Ontario, Canada. It is in the Great Lakes Basin and is a right tributary of the Montreal River.

Course
The river begins at an unnamed lake. It flows south, then turns west, and takes in the right tributary Hoppy Creek. The river turns southeast, and reaches its mouth at the Montreal River. The Montreal River flows to Lake Superior.

Tributaries
Hoppy Creek (right)

See also
List of rivers of Ontario

References

Rivers of Algoma District